Woody Woodpecker is an American animated web series starring the cartoon character of the same name created by Walter Lantz. The series premiered on YouTube on December 3, 2018.

In 2020, Woody Woodpecker and Wally Walrus appeared in a series of PSAs. On October 21, 2020, a trailer for a second season was released; the season premiered on October 28. On November 4, 2022, a trailer for a third season was released; the season premiered on November 6, 2022. The tenth episode of the third season of 2022, titled "Space Track", for some reason was not published on the official Woody Woodpecker channel on YouTube. However, it is available on the official Facebook page.

Production
On November 22, 2018, Deadline Hollywood reported that Universal 1440 Entertainment was producing a new series of Woody Woodpecker animated shorts exclusively for the official Woody Woodpecker YouTube channels in Brazilian Portuguese, Spanish and English. The first season was directed by Alex Zamm, who also directed the 2017 movie.

Voice cast
 Eric Bauza – Woody Woodpecker, Ghost, Bird, Yeti
 Tara Strong – Winnie Woodpecker, Splinter, Wendy Walrus, Veronica Buzzard
 Tom Kenny – Wally Walrus, Glorbnorb III, Todd, Big Bulk Mart Announcer, Easter Bunny, Wally's Mother, Cameraman, Basil Beaver, Wally's Boss
 Kevin Michael Richardson – Buzz Buzzard
 Nika Futterman – Knothead
 Brad Norman – Chilly Willy (Season 1)
 Dee Bradley Baker – Chilly Willy (Season 2–), Bees, Chickasaurus, Blob
 Scott Weil – Andy Panda, Director
 Jeff Bennett – Ari Cari
 Fred Stoller – Peacock
 Bernardo de Paula – Luiz, Sports Announcer
 Roger Craig Smith – Fella Furetti
 Candi Milo – Mother Nature, Mrs. Woodpecker
 Corey Burton – Narrator

Episodes

Series overview

Season 1 (2018)

Season 2 (2020)

Season 3 (2022)

References

External links
 
 Woody Woodpecker on Splash Entertainment's website

Animated television series reboots
2018 web series debuts
2010s American animated television series
American children's animated adventure television series
American children's animated comedy television series
American comedy web series
American flash animated web series
Television series by Splash Entertainment
Television series by Universal Television
Television series by Universal Animation Studios
YouTube original programming
Flash cartoons
Animated television series about birds
Animated television shows based on films
Woody Woodpecker